The 1948 USC Trojans baseball team represented the University of Southern California in the 1948 NCAA baseball season. The team was coached by co-head coaches Sam Barry and Rod Dedeaux.

The Trojans won the College World Series, defeating future U.S. President George H. W. Bush and the Yale Bulldogs in the championship series.

Roster

Schedule

Awards and honors 
Jim Brideweser
 All-PCC First Team

Wally Hood
 All-American First Team
 All-PCC First Team

Bill Lillie
 All-PCC Honorable Mention

Art Mazmanian
 All-PCC First Team
 All-American First Team

Bruce McKelvey
 All-PCC Second Team

Hank Workman
 All-PCC First Team
 All-American First Team

Bob Zuber
 All-PCC Honorable Mention

References 

USC
USC Trojans baseball seasons
College World Series seasons
NCAA Division I Baseball Championship seasons
Pac-12 Conference baseball champion seasons